Extra is an unincorporated community in Putnam County, West Virginia, United States. Its post office closed in 1912.

References 

Unincorporated communities in West Virginia
Unincorporated communities in Putnam County, West Virginia